Beastmaker Mountain is an adventure for fantasy role-playing games published by Mayfair Games in 1982 .

Contents
Beastmaker Mountain is a scenario in which the player characters investigate the abandoned villa of the wizard Orlow the Beastmaker and the caverns beneath. The adventure is suitable as a single game or as an addition to an existing campaign.  The player characters begin the adventure in a half-deserted village, where they learn of Beastmaker Mountain, which was once the home of a magic-user who specialized in the creation of strange animals.  The magic-user vanished and his wife has left to search for him after cursing the mountain so that it has been attracting evil monsters to the area.

Tower of Magicks is the sequel.

The adventure is suitable for use with Advanced Dungeons & Dragons, Dungeons & Dragons and Tunnels & Trolls.

Publication history
Beastmaker Mountain was written by William Fawcett, and was published by Mayfair Games in 1982 as a 32-page book with an outer folder and a cover sheet.

When Mayfair Games got into the RPG field, the company kicked off its Role Aids game line with Beastmaker Mountain (1982).

Reception
Kelly Grimes and Aaron Allston reviewed Beastmaker Mountain in The Space Gamer #58.  They described it as "a hero's adventure" but noted that it was not "a hack-'n-slash adventure of mismatches monsters, secret doors, and treasure strewn willy-nilly about a dungeon; Beastmaker Mountain was constructed with both sense and logic. An extensive amount of work has gone to detail. Monsters and treasures are placed logically and in the context of the area's rationale." They added: "The adventure has few flaws.  There are occasional outbreaks of silliness [...] but all these do is alter the tone of the adventure somewhat and can be worked around." Grimes and Allston concluded the review by saying: "All in all, the adventure is of good quality and excellent playability. It makes for a challenge and an enjoyable time".

References

Fantasy role-playing game adventures
Role Aids
Role-playing game supplements introduced in 1982